Newhart is an American sitcom television series that aired on CBS from October 25, 1982, to May 21, 1990, with a total of 184 half-hour episodes spanning eight seasons. The series stars Bob Newhart and Mary Frann as an Author and his wife who own and operate the Stratford Inn in rural Vermont. The small Vermont Town is home to many eccentric characters. TV Guide, TV Land, and A&E named the Newhart series finale as one of the most memorable in television history. The theme music for Newhart was composed by Henry Mancini.

Premise
Bob Newhart plays Dick Loudon, an author of do-it-yourself and travel books. He and his wife Joanna move from New York City to a small town in rural Vermont to operate the 200-year-old Stratford Inn. Although the town's name was never specified in the show, some media sources identified it as Norwich. The outside shot of the house is the Waybury Inn in East Middlebury.

Dick and Joanna run the inn with the help of sweet-natured but simple handyman George Utley and Leslie Vanderkellen, a Dartmouth College student and heiress who takes a job as a maid to find out what it's like to be "normal." Next door to the inn is the Minuteman Café, owned by Kirk Devane, a pathological liar. Leslie leaves before season two to continue her studies abroad, to be replaced by her cousin Stephanie, who, unlike Leslie, is vain, lazy, and spoiled.

Near the end of season two, Dick becomes the host of a local television show, Vermont Today, where he interviews an assortment of bizarre and colorful guests. His vapid, neurotic producer, Michael Harris, falls in love with Stephanie, their relationship providing a satire of 1980s excess.

The town is populated by oddballs whose behavior never ceases to bemuse the sane, mild-mannered everyman Dick. Among them are Larry, Darryl and Darryl, three brothers who normally worked as woodsmen, but also supported themselves with various odd jobs throughout the first two seasons. When Kirk moved away in the third season, the three brothers bought the Minuteman Cafe from him and were seen running it for the remainder of the series. Larry would always make an entrance saying "Hi! I'm Larry, this is my brother Darryl, and that's my other brother Darryl". Neither of the Darryls talked (until the series finale), but Larry's descriptions of their misadventures often venture into the surreal.

As the series progresses, the world around Dick grows increasingly illogical. The final episode reveals that the entire series has been a dream of Dr. Robert Hartley, Newhart's character in The Bob Newhart Show.

Cast

Main
Bob Newhart as Dick Loudon, owner of the Stratford Inn, author of how-to books and host of Vermont Today
Mary Frann as Joanna Loudon, Dick's wife; the co-owner of the Stratford Inn who also works as a realtor
Tom Poston as George Utley, the handyman/maintenance man at the Stratford Inn, a position that has been passed down in his family for generations
Jennifer Holmes as Leslie Vanderkellen, an heiress and student at Dartmouth College who works as a maid at the Stratford Inn (1982–83)
Steven Kampmann as Kirk Devane, a pathological liar and the owner of the neighboring Minuteman Café (1982–84)
William Sanderson as Larry, Tony Papenfuss as his brother Darryl and John Voldstad as his other brother Darryl, backwoodsmen who live in the same town. The three take over the Minuteman Café following Kirk's departure. The two Darryls never speak until the final episode. (recurring 1982–84, main 1984–90)
Julia Duffy as Stephanie Vanderkellen, Leslie's cousin, a vain, spoiled, and lazy heiress; replaces Leslie as the Stratford's maid after the first season (guest 1982, main 1983–90)
Peter Scolari as Michael Harris, the vapid, neurotic producer of Vermont Today; Stephanie's boyfriend and later husband (recurring 1983–84, main 1984–90)

Recurring
William Lanteau as Chester Wanamaker, the town's mayor (1982–90)
 Thomas Hill as Jim Dixon, Chester's best friend  (1982–90)
Rebecca York as Cindy Parker-Devane, a professional clown, Kirk's girlfriend and later wife (1983–84)
Jeff Doucette as Harley Estin, a friend of George who is always looking for a job (1983–88)
Fred Applegate as J.J. Wall, the director of Dick's television show (1984–87)
Ralph Manza as Bud, the assistant director of Dick's television show  (1984–90)
Linda Carlson as Bev Dutton, the television station manager (1984–87)
Todd Susman as Officer Shifflett, the town's chief of police (1984–90)
Melanie Chartoff as Dr. Mary Kaiser, Stephanie and Michael's therapist (1987–90)
Kathy Kinney as Prudence Goddard, the town librarian (1989–90)
David Pressman as Mr. Rusnak, the local shoe store manager (1989–90)
José Ferrer as Arthur Vanderkellen, Stephanie's father
Priscilla Morrill as Marian Vanderkellen, Stephanie's mother

"The Last Newhart"
The series finale of Newhart, titled "The Last Newhart", has been described as one of the most memorable in television history. The entire town is purchased by a visiting Japanese tycoon, who turns the hamlet into an enormous golf course and recreation resort. Dick and Joanna are the only townspeople who refuse to leave. The others accept million-dollar payoffs and leave in a farewell scene that parodies Fiddler on the Roof.

Five years later, Dick and Joanna continue to run the Stratford Inn, which is now located in the middle of the golf course. The other townspeople, now richer and older, unexpectedly return for a reunion. The Darryl brothers also speak for the first time on screen, loudly yelling "Quiet!" at their wives in unison. Dick gets frustrated with the increasingly chaotic scene, and storms out shouting "You're all crazy!", only to be knocked out by an errant golf ball.

The setting of the last scene is nighttime, in the bedroom of Dr. Bob Hartley (Newhart's character on The Bob Newhart Show) and his wife Emily (Suzanne Pleshette). Bob awakens, upset, and he wakes Emily to tell her about the very strange dream he has just had: that he was an innkeeper in a small Vermont town filled with eccentric characters.  Emily tells Bob "that settles it—no more Japanese food before you go to bed." Bob mentions his marriage to a "beautiful blonde," and that Emily should wear more sweaters (in reference to Mary Frann's form-fitting tops) before the credits roll.

This ending is a parody of the episode of the nighttime soap opera Dallas, where the character of Bobby Ewing had been killed off. Fan reaction to his death was so negative, the producers of Dallas brought the actor Patrick Duffy, who played Bobby Ewing back at the start of the next season, by making the entire previous season of Dallas (where the family reacted to Bobby's death) nothing but a dream Bobby's wife had.

Several references are made to Newhart's former show, including the use of its theme song and credits. Although the Bob Newhart Show theme was missing from the final closing credit shot in the series' initial syndication run, the theme has been reinstated in the current version syndicated by 20th Century Fox Television.

The MTM cat logo normally closed the show end credits with Newhart voicing-over the "meow", but for the finale, the cat's voiceover was a reprise of Darryl and Darryl yelling "Quiet!"

Reception to the finale
Interviews with Newhart, Pleshette, and director Dick Martin reveal that the final scene was kept a secret from the cast and most of the crew. A fake ending was written to throw off the tabloids that involved Dick Loudon going to heaven after being hit with a golf ball and talking to God played by George Burns or George C. Scott. Pleshette was kept hidden until her scene was shot. When the scene began, many people in the live audience recognized the bedroom set from The Bob Newhart Show and burst into spontaneous applause. Pleshette and Newhart performed the scene in one take.

In 1991, the cast of The Bob Newhart Show reunited in a primetime special. One of the things they did was analyze Bob's dream. During the discussion, the Hartleys' neighbor, Howard Borden (Bill Daily), quipped, "I had a dream like that once. I dreamed I was an astronaut in Florida for five seasons", while scenes were shown from I Dream of Jeannie, which featured Daily in all five seasons. At the end of the reunion special, Dr. Bob Hartley gets on the elevator only to see three familiar workmen doing repairs in the elevator and one of them says to Bob, "Hi. I'm Larry. This is my brother Darryl, and this is my other brother Darryl."

Entertainment Weekly claimed in 1995 that Newhart's wife Ginny had conceived the idea for the finale, but the show's executive producers, Mark Egan, Mark Solomon, and Bob Bendetson, denied this in a letter to the editor, "[T]he final episode of Newhart was not 'dreamed up' by Bob's wife, Ginny. She had absolutely no connection with the show. ... We wrote and produced the Emmy-nominated script (with special thanks to Dan O'Shannon)."

Newhart himself, in his 2006 book I Shouldn't Even Be Doing This! And Other Things that Strike Me as Funny, stated that his wife had indeed proposed the ending of Newhart. He reiterated this in a 2013 interview with director and comedian David Steinberg, saying,

Suzanne Pleshette, in a Television Academy interview, also avers that the idea was Ginny's, having heard it from Ginny over dinner with the Newharts several years before the finale was shot.

In November 2005, the series finale was named by TV Guide and TV Land as the most unexpected moment in TV history. The episode was watched by 29.5 million US viewers, bringing in an 18.7/29 rating/share, and ranking as the most-watched program that week.

In 2011, the finale was ranked number four on the TV Guide Network special, TV's Most Unforgettable Finales, and in 2013 was ranked number 1 in Entertainment Weekly's 25 Best TV Series Finales Ever.

In popular culture
On the February 11, 1995, episode of Saturday Night Live which was hosted by Bob Newhart, the episode's closing sketch ended with a redux of Newhart'''s final scene, in which Bob Hartley again wakes with his wife Emily (special guest Suzanne Pleshette) and tells her that he had just had a dream of hosting Saturday Night Live. Emily responds, "Saturday Night Live, is that show still on?"—this during a period when SNL was heavily criticized for its declining quality.

In 2010, Jimmy Kimmel Live! presented several parody alternate endings to the television show Lost, one of which mirrored the finale of Newhart complete with a cameo appearance by Bob Newhart and with Lost star Evangeline Lilly in place of Emily/Pleshette.

The final scene with Newhart and Pleshette was later parodied in an alternate ending to the television series Breaking Bad where actor Bryan Cranston wakes from a dream next to his Malcolm in the Middle co-star Jane Kaczmarek where they assume their respective roles of Hal and Lois. Hal recounts the events of Breaking Bad in humorous fashion as though he is horrified that he could do those things albeit as Walter White. Lois reassures him that everything is all right and the final shot is of Walter's hat.

The final scene of The Late Late Show with Craig Ferguson parodied this, as well. After revealing that Bob Newhart had been playing the on-set pantomime horse Secretariat, Ferguson wakes up as his The Drew Carey Show character Nigel Wick, in bed with his co-star Drew Carey. The two then discuss the crazy possibility of Wick being a talk show host and Carey losing weight and becoming a game show host. (The shot continued with a parody of the twist ending of St. Elsewhere and then the closing song from The Sopranos finale.)

ReceptionNewhart was a solid ratings winner, finishing its first five seasons in the Nielsen top 25. Despite not finishing in the top 30 for its last two seasons, Bob Newhart stated in an interview with the Archive of American Television that CBS was satisfied enough with the show's ratings to renew it for a ninth season in 1990. However, Newhart, who was anxious to move on to other projects, declined the offer, promising CBS that he would develop a new series for the network, which he was under contract to do. This resulted in the 1992 series Bob, which lasted two seasons.

Awards

Nominations
Emmy Awards
The show was nominated for 25 Emmy Awards but never won.

1983
 Outstanding Comedy Series – Sheldon Bull, Producer; Barry Kemp, Executive Producer
 Outstanding Video Tape Editing For a Series – Andy Ackerman
1984
 Outstanding Comedy Series – Sheldon Bull, Producer; Barry Kemp, Executive Producer
 Outstanding Supporting Actor in a Comedy Series – Tom Poston
 Outstanding Supporting Actress in a Comedy Series – Julia Duffy
1985
 Outstanding Lead Actor in a Comedy Series – Bob Newhart
 Outstanding Supporting Actress in a Comedy Series – Julia Duffy
1986
 Outstanding Lead Actor in a Comedy Series – Bob Newhart
 Outstanding Sound Mixing For a Comedy Series or Special – Andrew MacDonald, Sound Mixer; Bill Nicholson, Sound Mixer; Craig Porter, Sound Mixer; Richard Wachter, Sound Mixer
 Outstanding Supporting Actor in a Comedy Series – Tom Poston
 Outstanding Supporting Actress in a Comedy Series – Julia Duffy
1987
 Outstanding Lead Actor in a Comedy Series – Bob Newhart
 Outstanding Supporting Actor in a Comedy Series:
 Tom Poston
 Peter Scolari
 Outstanding Supporting Actress in a Comedy Series – Julia Duffy
 Outstanding Writing For a Comedy Series – David Mirkin ("Co-Hostess Twinkie")
1988
 Outstanding Editing For a Series (Multi-Camera Production) – Michael Wilcox, Editor
 Outstanding Supporting Actor in a Comedy Series – Peter Scolari
 Outstanding Supporting Actress in a Comedy Series – Julia Duffy
1989
 Outstanding Guest Actress in a Comedy Series – Eileen Brennan
 Outstanding Supporting Actor in a Comedy Series – Peter Scolari
 Outstanding Supporting Actress in a Comedy Series – Julia Duffy
1990
 Outstanding Editing For a Series (Multi-Camera Production) – Michael Wilcox, Editor
 Outstanding Supporting Actress in a Comedy Series – Julia Duffy
 Outstanding Writing For a Comedy Series – Bob Bendetson, Mark Egan and Mark Solomon ("The Last Newhart")

Golden Globe AwardsNewhart earned six nominations for Golden Globe Awards.
 Television Series – Musical or Comedy (1984)
 Actor in a Television Series – Musical or Comedy: Bob Newhart (1983–1986)
 Actress in a Supporting Role in a Series, Mini-Series or Motion Picture Made for Television: Julia Duffy (1988)

Other awards
Newhart was nominated for one Casting Society of America award and four nominations for TV Land Awards. Newhart won a total of four Viewers for Quality Television Awards.

Home media
20th Century Fox released season one of Newhart'' on DVD in Region 1 on February 26, 2008.

In November 2013, Shout! Factory announced it had acquired the rights to the series. It has since released the entire series in individual season sets.

References

External links

 

1980s American sitcoms
1980s American workplace comedy television series
1982 American television series debuts
1990 American television series endings
1990s American sitcoms
1990s American workplace comedy television series
CBS original programming
English-language television shows
Television series about marriage
Television series about television
Television series by MTM Enterprises
Television shows about dreams
Television shows set in Vermont